NASCAR, the most popular motorsport in the United States, has worked with video game developers to design several video games. In 2003, EA Sports received an exclusive console license to produce NASCAR games, eliminating Papyrus and Hasbro Interactive as competitors. In May 2009, iRacing.com received a license to run NASCAR-sanctioned online racing starting in 2010. In June 2009 at the E3 Gaming Expo, NASCAR was revealed to be a part of the Gran Turismo series for the first time in Gran Turismo 5 for the PlayStation 3.

Developers

Papyrus Design Group

In 1994, Papyrus Design Group, an up-and-coming simulation racing developer (at the time) that was best known for the IndyCar Racing series, released the first installation to the NASCAR Racing series into the video game market.

Over the next decade Papyrus teamed with Sierra Entertainment and continued producing games for their NASCAR Racing series. The NASCAR Racing games were universally praised for their accuracy in terms of physics and track feel, with NASCAR Cup and Xfinity (formerly Nationwide) Series drivers regularly practicing for upcoming tracks using the games. Prior to sweeping both races at Pocono in 2006, Denny Hamlin had only seen the track in NASCAR Racing 2003 Season.

Electronic Arts

Electronic Arts, through their EA Sports banner, developed NASCAR games for the Sony PlayStation, Sega Saturn, and Nintendo 64 under names such as NASCAR 98, NASCAR 99, NASCAR 2000 and NASCAR Road Racing. Also, a big hit for the company was NASCAR Rumble, a spin-off of the normal NASCAR racing games. The company expanded into NASCAR games for PC, Game Boy Color for their 2000 game, and the PlayStation 2 for their 2001 game, the last under the old name. For 2002, the series was renamed NASCAR Thunder, and by 2003, has simultaneously been released on GameCube, Xbox, PlayStation 2, PC, and the PlayStation.

EA Sports decided to split their old "Thunder" titles into two separate racing lines; one for consoles focused on gameplay, and one for PC, which attempted to focus on technical accuracy in the spirit of the old Papyrus/Sierra lines – indeed the PC game used many former members of the Papyrus development teams (although David Kaemmer was not involved). The games were given differing names, as to not confuse the two, with the console series renamed NASCAR 2005: Chase for the Cup (released in 2004, a reference to the new NASCAR playoff format) and the PC series renamed NASCAR SimRacing (released in 2005). Sweeping gameplay changes meant that the "Chase for the Cup" name was dropped from the 2006 edition of the console game. Instead, the game was titled NASCAR 06: Total Team Control. The new name is derived from the new feature by which a player who has teammates in the field can actually switch to their teammates' cars and control them during a race. It was released on August 30, 2005. Released on September 6, 2006, NASCAR 07 was EA Sports' tenth game in the series. NASCAR 09 was the final game in the EA Sports NASCAR series. It is available on Xbox 360 and PlayStation 3, as well as PlayStation 2. The NASCAR series took a different approach in 2009, as EA introduced NASCAR Kart Racing on the Wii console. It was later announced that EA would not make a NASCAR 10, and the series is currently on hiatus because of a drop in sales and now has lost the license they had with NASCAR since 2003.

2010–present
Starting in 2010, EA's license to make NASCAR games expired. Gran Turismo 5 features NASCAR in the game with cars from 2010 season and some tracks on the NASCAR schedule; 2011 season cars were added later in an update. Also, iRacing.com and NASCAR started an Online Racing Series which started in 2010 and the NASCAR Peak Antifreeze Series later that year. iRacing and NASCAR had a close partnership and by the start of the 2014 season, the simulation had every car make/model that has run in Sprint Cup from 2013 and 2014 seasons and every track that the NASCAR Sprint Cup Series on the simulation. Other games that came out with NASCAR licensing after 2010 included Days of Thunder: Arcade (based on Days of Thunder), which is a game sold as an Xbox Live Arcade or PlayStation Network game for the Xbox 360 and PS3.

Eutechnyx

In 2010, Eutechnyx began creating games based on NASCAR starting in 2011 with NASCAR The Game: 2011. NASCAR The Game: Inside Line was released on November 6, 2012. Afterwards, Eutechnyx made two new games: the first NASCAR licensed video game for iOS, and NASCAR The Game: 2013 for Steam. Eutechnyx switched publishers for NASCAR '14 to Deep Silver after having Activision publishing previous games of the NASCAR The Game series. DMi Games replaced Eutechnyx for NASCAR '15 on January 1, 2015.

Dusenberry Martin Racing / 704Games
Dusenberry Martin Racing took over the NASCAR license and began developing new games in 2016, as well as releasing a Eutechnyx-developed update game for the 2015 season. DMR is an American-based company located in the NASCAR Plaza building in Uptown, Charlotte, North Carolina. The company is headed by former Hasbro Interactive CEO Tom Dusenberry (developers of the NASCAR Heat series) and Ed Martin, former executive at Papyrus, Hasbro, Atari, EA Sports, and most recent licensee Eutechnyx. DMR partnered with NASCAR Heat developer Monster Games to create NASCAR Heat Evolution.

In 2017, DMR rebranded to 704Games and hired former NASCAR Media Group President, NASCAR Senior Vice President and DMR chairman Paul Brooks as CEO.

Other
Other NASCAR games include Hasbro Interactive's NASCAR Heat; Papyrus' NASCAR Legends, which took players back to the 1970 season, featuring a different point system, and many different tracks. There is also a pinball game: 3-D Ultra NASCAR Pinball. This game was based on the NASCAR Racing 3 engine; EA Sports' NASCAR Revolution (released between NASCAR 99, which came out in 1998, and NASCAR 2000, which came out in 1999); and NASCAR Rumble, an EA game incorporating some of the features of Nintendo's Mario Kart series, but with NASCAR car designs. Gran Turismo 5 featured NASCAR as one of several new licenses that was included in the game.

List

Simulation/realism

Arcade/casual/other

Games with NASCAR as a non-core element
This list includes games that have a NASCAR license but are not based specifically around it (such as racing simulators with other series/disciplines of racing worked into them, or which have mods which add NASCAR cars and/or tracks).

See also
ARCA Sim Racing '08 – a simulator for the sister ARCA Racing Series
Daytona USA – stock car racing series created by Sega

References

External links
Electronic Arts

 
Nascar
Nascar
Video Games